Xantus's murrelet, native to the California Current system, has been split into two species:

 Scripps's murrelet, Synthliboramphus scrippsi
 Guadalupe murrelet, Synthliboramphus hypoleucus

Birds by common name